The High Commissioner of the Republic of Maldives to Malaysia is the head of the Maldives's diplomatic mission to Malaysia. The position has the rank and status of an Ambassador Extraordinary and Plenipotentiary and is based in the High Commission of the Maldives, Kuala Lumpur.  At least formally, between October 2016 and 1 February 2020 when the Maldives were not part of the Commonwealth, the title was Ambassador.  

The Deputy High Commissioner, Mizna Shareef, is head of the Maldivian mission since April 2022.

List of representatives

See also 

 Malaysia–Maldives relations

External links

References 

High Commissioners of the Maldives to Malaysia
Maldives
Malaysia
Malaysia and the Commonwealth of Nations
Maldives and the Commonwealth of Nations